Korean Air Lines Flight 015 was a Boeing 747-200 operating a scheduled passenger flight from Los Angeles International Airport, in Los Angeles, California, to Gimpo International Airport in Seoul, South Korea with an intermediate stop in Anchorage, Alaska, that crashed while attempting to land on 19 November 1980. Of the 226 passengers and crew on board, 15 were killed in the accident. The aircraft was damaged beyond repair

Accident
The wind was calm with a visibility of 1,000 m in fog as the Korean Air Lines 747 made its approach to Runway 14 at Gimpo International Airport. The pilot reported trouble with the controls shortly before the aircraft touched down 90 metres short of the threshold and contacted an embankment slope. The aircraft's cargo compartment was ruptured after the main landing gear were pushed into it. Flight 015 slid down the runway on its belly and a fire broke out. The aircraft was evacuated but six crew and nine passengers were killed in the accident and four passengers had serious injuries.

Cause
Crashed short of runway due to crew error in low visibility weather.

References

1980 in South Korea
Aviation accidents and incidents in 1980
Airliner accidents and incidents caused by pilot error
Airliner accidents and incidents involving controlled flight into terrain
Aviation accidents and incidents in South Korea
Accidents and incidents involving the Boeing 747
015
Gimpo International Airport
November 1980 events in Asia